The 2013 season was Strømsgodset's 7th season in Tippeligaen following their promotion back to the top flight in 2006. It was Ronny Deila's sixth season in charge, and he led them to their first Tippeligaen title since 1970.  In the cup they were knocked out by 2. divisjon side Asker and they were knocked out of the UEFA Europa League by Jablonec in the 3rd qualifying round after beating Debreceni in the 2nd round.

Squad

Transfers

Winter

In:

 
 

 

Out:

Summer

In:

 

Out:

Competitions

Tippeligaen

Results summary

Results by round

Results

Table

Norwegian Cup

Europa League

Qualifying phase

Squad statistics

Appearances and goals

|-
|colspan="14"|Players away from Strømsgodset on loan:
|-
|colspan="14"|Players who left Strømsgodset during the season:

|}

Goal scorers

Disciplinary record

Notes

References

Strømsgodset Toppfotball seasons
Stromsgodset
Norwegian football championship-winning seasons